Wendy Murray (born 1974) is a visual artist and arts educator, formerly known as Mini Graff. Under her former persona, Murray worked as an urban street-poster artist between 2003–2010, working in and around  Sydney's urban fringe. Since 2014, Murray's art expanded into traditional forms of drawing and artist book design, whilst still engaging with social and political issues through poster-making. Murray's use of letraset transfers, accompanied with vibrant colours and fluorescent inks, references the work of studios from the 1960s through to the 1980s, including the community-based Earthworks Poster Collective and Redback Graphix. A 2018 collaboration with The Urban Crew, a 17-person collective of socially engaged geographers, planners, political scientists and sociologists, resulted in the Sydney – We Need to Talk! artist book, addressing issues of development, transport congestion, housing affordability and commercialisation of public space.

Background
Wendy Murray was born in New Zealand. She gained a Bachelor in Design from Massey University, New Zealand, in 1999 and, following a move to Australia, earned a Master of Fine Arts from the National Art School, Sydney, in 2014. Between 2008–12 she was Project Coordinator at MAY’S – The May Lane Street Art Project, Sydney. Her academic teaching career included positions as Lecturer in Fine Art Printmaking at the National Art School, Sydney between 2010–15, and Lecturer in Printmedia at the Sydney College of the Arts between 2011–12 and from 2015–19. Wendy Murray was a consultant researcher in Geography and Urban Studies at the University of Western Sydney during 2013–14.

Work as Mini Graff
The streets and inhabitants of Sydney's urban fringe provided the content and impetus for Wendy Murray's work as Mini Graff. Graff stenciled and printed images onto a variety of media (walls, boards, vinyl, paper, rarely canvas), which strongly relate to the given environment and community, transforming an anonymous repetitive urban landscape into a unique and personal aesthetic experience. Parody, humour and social commentary are common themes in Graff's work – notions that are translated into experiments with scale in public space – from discrete interventions to large-scale installations.

Graff has participated in several public art projects including Sydney Art and About, plus coordinated and presented numerous printmaking workshops to various audience groups including high school students, tertiary institutions and public art galleries. Graff's Suburban Roadhouse series explores concepts of trademark and ownership in public/domestic space.

Mini Graff is featured in the video for Deepchild's song "Blackness of the Sea".

Techniques 
Mini Graff's primary medium is handcut stencils transferred with aerosol paint or daubed with sponges. Her installations range from single colour, single stencil works to multiple stencils and colours incorporating 3D elements such as handcut butterflies, plastic figures of people and model houses.

Depending on the nature and exposure of the site, Mini Graff also pre-prints onto paper, stickers and wallpaper, and hangs them in the place of painted stencils.

Mini Graff's recent work has expanded into exploring colour and abstract patterns using brightly coloured adhesive vinyl strips to draw pedestrians' attention to common street structures. Her work demonstrates how a simple treatment applied to an object rendered invisible by familiarity, such as a sign post, can return it to our awareness.

Exhibitions and workshops
 2019 – Lead artist, Girls Are Not Toys (Workshop), Gympie Regional Art Gallery, QLD, AUS.
 2019 – Sydney We Need To Talk! Wendy Murray & Friends, Cross Art Projects.
 2019 – Night & Day, Bathurst Regional Art Gallery, NSW, AUS.
 2018 – Colby Country, Megalo Print Studio + Gallery.
 2018 – FEMINAE – Typographic Voices of Women (group exhibition), Hoffmitz Milken Center for Typography, Art Center College of Design, CA USA.
 2018 – Propaganda (group exhibition), Mornington Peninsula Regional Gallery, VIC, AUS
 2017 – Chartjunk, Canberra Contemporary Art Space (CCAS), Canberra, ACT.
 2017 – The Drawing Exchange (group exhibition), Adelaide School of Art, SA, AUS.
 2017 – Amplify & Multiply (group exhibition), The Press at Colorado College, Colorado Springs, CO, USA
 2016 – Pull your punches, Hamilton Ink Spot, St Paul, MN, USA.
 2016 – Future Feminist Archive (group exhibition), Sydney University, NSW, AUS.
 2015 – My totem (workshop), Balit Gulynia, Aboriginal Community Group, Melbourne.
 2014 – Sextet (group exhibition), Delmar Gallery, NSW.
 Brunswick Street Gallery Works on Paper 2010, May 2010, Melbourne, Australia
 Ikea Home Project, July–August 2009
 MAY's Retrospective 2009, Redfern, Australia, March–April 2009
 GRRRLS, February 2008, aMbush Gallery, St Peters, Australia
 Urban Skins, August 2007, Pinnacles Gallery, Thuringowa, Australia
 extra cheese, Gallery FortyFour, Sydney, Australia
 Mays at MTV Gallery, September 2007, Sydney, Australia
 Doppelganger Mix, Darlinghurst, Australia
 Sydney Art and About, October 2006, Sydney, Australia
 Building Sites Taking Shape, September 2006, Maitland, Australia
 Stencil Festival, August 2006, Melbourne/Sydney, Australia
 Post-it: An Exquisite Corpse, June 2006, Peloton Gallery, Sydney, Australia
 Mays Retrospective Exhibition, May 2006, Mays Gallery, St Peters, Australia
 Manly Arts Festival, September 2005, Manly, Australia
 Sydney Design 05, August 2005, Sydney, Australia
 StreetWorks (Forever), July 2005, Sydney, Australia
 Sydney Esquisse 05, April 2005, Sydney, Australia
 Cut and Spray – An Exhibition of Stencil Art, April 2005, Volume Art Space, Newcastle, Australia
 Box Street II, September 2005, Darlinghurst, Australia
 Box Street I, September 2003, Darlinghurst, Australia

Residencies
 2018 – Inaugural Printer in Residence, University of Sydney, AUS.
 2018 – Hill End Artist in Residence, NSW, AUS.
 2018 – International Printing Museum AIR, Carson, CA, USA.
 2018 – Resident Artist, Waverley Artist Studios, Waverley Council, NSW, AUS. 
 2017 – Research Residency, Center for the Study of Political Graphics, CA, USA.
 2016 – Hamilton Ink Spot, St. Paul, MN USA (Supported by The City of Saint Paul).
 2016 – ANU Research Residency, Australian National University, ACT, AUS.
 2016 – The Art Vault, Mildura.
 2014 – Bundanon Trust Residency, NSW.
 Megalo Print Studio, February–March 2010, Megalo, Australia
 Hill End Press, Haefligers Cottage, April 2010, Hill End, Australia

Selected commissions and awards
 2018 – Australian War Memorial
 2018 – University of Sydney Printer in Residence Award 
 2018 – Mount Alexander Shire Mechanics Lane poster commission.
 2018 – NAVA funding to produce a series of screen prints with Catherine O’Donnell.
 2018 – Love is Hard Work – Castlemaine, VIC 
 2017 – The Newtown Hub / Newtown Art Seat (awarded by Inner West Council) 
 2014 – Behind this Smile, Hobsons Bay City Council 
 2014 – Hobsons Bay City Council Mayoral Fund award to seed a screen print based social enterprise for at risk youth.
 2014 – Australian Print Council commission print award

Publications
 Rebecca Beardmore, Talking in Print, IMPRINT Magazine, Print Council of Australia, volume 54, No.1, 2019, pp. 29–32.
 Broke but not Broken, FEMINAE – Typographic Voices of Women, Hoffmitz Milken Center for Typography, ArtCenter College of Design, California, 2018, pg. 45–46.
 Colby Country, Imprint, Winter 2018, Volume 53, No.2. pg. 42–46.
 Banksy in the Burbs, Art Guide, 2016.
 Antonia Aitken, Artist as Conduit, Imprint Magazine, Winter 2015, volume 50, No. 2, 2015.
 K. Iveson, C. McAuliffe, W. Murray and M. Peet, Reframing Graffiti and Street Art in the City of Sydney, Report of the Mural, Street Art and Graffiti Review Project, City of Sydney Council, 2014, pp124.

Artist books
 Night & Day – Hill End drawings by Wendy Murray, digital, perfect bound, edition 200, 2019. 
 Sydney – We Need to Talk!, digital, screen print, perfect binding / hand-bound, edition 100, 2018.
 Pull Your Punches, digital, perfect bound, edition 75, 2017.
 The Daily – Drawing Inspiration, digital, perfect bound, edition 75, 2017.

Curatorial
 Wendy Murray and Stuart Bailey, Fresh Blood – Redback Graphix and its Aftermath, Casula Powerhouse Arts Centre, 13 January – 17 March 2018

Education
 2014 – Master of Fine Arts from the National Art School, Sydney.
 1999 – Bachelor in Design from Massey University, New Zealand.

See also 
List of Street Artists
Types of graffiti
Stencil Graffiti

References

Further reading

External links 
 Mini Graff's web site

New Zealand artists
Australian graphic designers
Australian poster artists
1974 births
Living people
Australian women artists
Australian graffiti artists
Women graphic designers
Women graffiti artists
Women muralists
Culture jamming
Artists from Sydney